Klub malog fudbala Kopernikus SAS, is a Serbian futsal club based in Zrenjanin.

From 2003 until 2008, the club made its greatest achievements when it won four consecutive national championships. A the time, it was named KMF Marbo and was sponsored by food company Marbo Product. Also, from 2011 to 2013 it was three times runner-up in the competition.

History

Names of the club through history

Crest through history

Honours

National
3 Serbia & Montenegro League: 2004, 2005, 2006
1 Serbian League: 2007
Serbian Cup: 2011, 2012

Notable former players
 Zoran Rakićević
 Predrag Brzaković
 Vladimir Ranisavljević
 Darko Tofoski
 Igor Šošo
 Željko Borojević
 Goran Ivančić
 Vladan Cvetanović
 Marko Perić
 Zoran Dimić
 Predrag Rajić
 Bojan Pavićević
 Željko Dragoljević
 Borko Surudžić
 Milan Bogdanović
 Nenê 
 Milan Rakić
 Vladimir Lazić
 Nenad Krstić
 Jovan Đorđević
 Marko Pršić
 Nenad Roknić
 Nikola Matijević
 Aleksandar Živanović
 Slaven Novoselac
 Vladimir Milosavac
 Aleksa Antonić
 Nikola Ranisavljević
 Nikola Josimović
 Dražen Novoselac
 Vladimir Popović
 Davor Stanković
 Željko Petrović 
 Boris Čizmar
 Aarón Jeréz (Aarón Jerez)
 Dražen Arvaji
 David Kepashvili (David Kepaschwili) or (Dato Kefashvili)
 Nemanja Kovačević

Coaching history
 Dragan Milačić
 Dejan Knežević
 Aca Kovačević
 Dejan Majes

External links
Official Website
UEFA profile

Futsal clubs in Serbia